is a former professional Japanese tennis player.

In her career, she won six singles and seven doubles titles on the ITF Women's Circuit. On 12 September 2016, she reached her career-high singles ranking of world No. 109. On 17 November 2014, she peaked at No. 185 in the WTA doubles rankings.

Eguchi won her first $50k title at the 2014 Burnie International, defeating Elizaveta Kulichkova in the final. Six months later, she advanced to her first ever WTA Tour quarterfinal at the Baku Cup, losing in three sets to Bojana Jovanovski.

WTA 125 tournament finals

Singles: 1 (runner–up)

Doubles: 1 (runner–up)

ITF Circuit finals

Singles: 11 (6 titles, 5 runner–ups)

Doubles: 11 (7 titles, 4 runner–ups)

References

External links

 
 
 Misa Eguchi at the Japan Tennis Association 

1992 births
Living people
Sportspeople from Fukuoka Prefecture
Japanese female tennis players
Tennis players at the 2014 Asian Games
Asian Games medalists in tennis
Asian Games bronze medalists for Japan
Medalists at the 2014 Asian Games
20th-century Japanese women
21st-century Japanese women